Chevalier Leon de Biliński (15 June 1846 in  Zalischyky, Galicia, now Ukraine – 14 June 1923 in Vienna) was a Polish-Austrian statesman of the Biliński family. He had several important political functions in the Habsburg monarchy and independent Poland: He was President of Austrian State Railways (Kaiserlich-königliche österreichische Staatsbahnen) (1893-1895), Minister of Finance of Austria (1895–97, 1909–11) and Minister of Finance of Austria-Hungary (1912-1915), Governor of the Austro-Hungarian Bank (1900-1909), Governor of Bosnia and Herzegovina (1912−1915), Minister of Finance of the Republic of Poland (1919), president of the Supreme National Committee (1914−1917) and Governor of Galicia (1895−1897).

Biliński strongly supported women's intellectual and economic emancipation and their free access to higher education. In 1876 he became a member of the Polish Academy of Learning. His academic and feminist efforts later bore fruit — in 1897, the first female students graduated from Lwów University.  He was awarded the Knight’s Cross of the Order of Polonia Restituta in 1923.

External links
 Biliński on Austrian Commanders

References

1846 births
1923 deaths
People from Zalishchyky
People from the Kingdom of Galicia and Lodomeria
Polish Austro-Hungarians
19th-century Polish nobility
Finance Ministers of Austria
Finance ministers of Austria-Hungary
Finance Ministers of Poland
Members of the Austrian House of Deputies (1879–1885)
Members of the Austrian House of Deputies (1885–1891)
Members of the Austrian House of Deputies (1891–1897)
Members of the Austrian House of Deputies (1897–1900)
Members of the Austrian House of Deputies (1901–1907)
Members of the Austrian House of Deputies (1907–1911)
Members of the Austrian House of Deputies (1911–1918)
Members of the House of Lords (Austria)
Members of the Diet of Galicia and Lodomeria
Academic staff of the University of Lviv
Commanders of the Order of Franz Joseph